The Celtic Football Club, commonly known as Celtic, is a Scottish professional football club based in Glasgow, which plays in the Scottish Premiership. The club was founded in 1887 with the purpose of alleviating poverty in the immigrant Irish population in the East End of Glasgow. They played their first match in May 1888, a friendly match against Rangers which Celtic won 5–2. Celtic established themselves within Scottish football, winning six successive league titles during the first decade of the 20th century. The club enjoyed their greatest successes during the 1960s and 70s under Jock Stein, when they won nine consecutive league titles and the 1967 European Cup. Celtic have played in green and white throughout their history, adopting hoops in 1903, which have been used ever since.

Celtic are one of only five clubs in the world to have won over 100 trophies in their history. The club has won the Scottish league championship 52 times, most recently in 2021–22, the Scottish Cup 40 times and the Scottish League Cup 21 times. The club's greatest season was 1966–67, when Celtic became the first British team to win the European Cup, also winning the Scottish league championship, the Scottish Cup, the League Cup and the Glasgow Cup. Celtic also reached the 1970 European Cup Final and the 2003 UEFA Cup Final, losing in both.

Celtic have a long-standing fierce rivalry with Rangers, and the clubs are known as the Old Firm, seen by some as the world's biggest football derby. The club's fanbase was estimated in 2003 as being around nine million worldwide, and there are more than 160 Celtic supporters clubs in over 20 countries. An estimated 80,000 fans travelled to Seville for the 2003 UEFA Cup Final, and their "extraordinarily loyal and sporting behaviour" in spite of defeat earned the club Fair Play awards from FIFA and UEFA.

History

Celtic Football Club was formally constituted at a meeting in St. Mary's church hall in East Rose Street (now Forbes Street), Calton, Glasgow, by Irish Marist Brother Walfrid on 6 November 1887, with the purpose of alleviating poverty in the East End of Glasgow by raising money for the charity Walfrid had instituted, the Poor Children's Dinner Table. Walfrid's move to establish the club as a means of fund-raising was largely inspired by the example of Hibernian, which was formed out of the immigrant Irish population a few years earlier in Edinburgh. Walfrid's own suggestion of the name Celtic (pronounced Seltik) was intended to reflect the club's Irish and Scottish roots and was adopted at the same meeting. The club has the official nickname, The Bhoys. However, according to the Celtic press office, the newly established club was known to many as "the bold boys". A postcard from the early 20th century that pictured the team and read "The Bould Bhoys" is the first known example of the unique spelling. The extra h imitates the spelling system of Gaelic, wherein the letter b  is often accompanied by the letter h.

On 28 May 1888, Celtic played their first official match against Rangers and won 5–2 in what was described as a "friendly encounter". Neil McCallum scored Celtic's first goal. Celtic's first kit consisted of a white shirt with a green collar, black shorts, and emerald green socks. The original club crest was a simple green cross on a red oval background. In 1889 Celtic reached the final of the Scottish Cup in their first season taking part in the competition, but lost 2–1 to Third Lanark. Celtic reached the final again in 1892 and this time were victorious after defeating Queen's Park 5–1, the club's first major honour. Several months later the club moved to its new ground, Celtic Park, and in the following season won the Scottish League Championship for the first time. In 1895, Celtic set the League record for the highest home score when they beat Dundee 11–0.

In 1897, the club became a private limited company and Willie Maley was appointed as the first 'secretary-manager'. Between 1905 and 1910, Celtic won the Scottish League Championship six times in a row. They also won the Scottish Cup in both 1907 and 1908, the first times a Scottish club had ever won the double. During World War I, Celtic won the league four times in a row, including 62 matches unbeaten between November 1915 and April 1917. The mid-1920s saw the emergence of Jimmy McGrory as one of the most prolific goalscorers in British football history; over a sixteen-year playing career, he scored 550 goals in 547 games (including 16 goals for Clydebank during a season on loan in 1923–24), a British goal-scoring record to this day. In January 1940, Willie Maley's retirement was announced. He was 71 years old and had served the club in varying roles for nearly 52 years, initially as a player and then as secretary-manager. Jimmy McStay became manager of the club in February 1940. He spent over five years in this role, although due to the Second World War no official competitive league football took place during this time. The Scottish Football League and Scottish Cup were suspended and in their place regional league competitions were set up. Celtic did not do particularly well during the war years, but did win the Victory in Europe Cup held in May 1945 as a one-off football match to celebrate Victory in Europe Day.

Ex-player and captain Jimmy McGrory took over as manager in 1945. Under McGrory, Celtic defeated Arsenal, Manchester United and Hibernian to win the Coronation Cup, a one-off tournament held in May 1953 to commemorate the coronation of Elizabeth II. He also led them to a League and Cup double in 1954. On 19 October 1957, Celtic defeated Rangers in the final of the Scottish League Cup at Hampden Park in Glasgow, retaining the trophy they had won for the first time the previous year; the 7–1 scoreline remains a record win in a British domestic cup final. The years that followed, however, saw Celtic struggle and the club won no more trophies under McGrory.

Former Celtic captain Jock Stein succeeded McGrory in 1965. He won the Scottish Cup in his first few months at the club, and then led them to the League title the following season.

1967 was Celtic's annus mirabilis. The club won every competition they entered: the Scottish League, the Scottish Cup, the Scottish League Cup, the Glasgow Cup, and the European Cup. Under the leadership of Stein, the club defeated Inter Milan 2–1 at the Estádio Nacional in Lisbon, on 25 May 1967 to become the first British team, and indeed the first from outside Spain, Portugal and Italy to win the competition. They remain the only Scottish team to have reached the final. The players that day, all of whom were born within 30 miles of Glasgow, subsequently became known as the "Lisbon Lions". The following season Celtic lost to Racing Club of Argentina in the Intercontinental Cup.

Celtic reached the European Cup Final again in 1970, but were beaten 2–1 by Feyenoord at the San Siro in Milan. The club continued to dominate Scottish football in the early 1970s, and their Scottish Championship win in 1974 was their ninth consecutive league title, equalling the joint world record held at the time by MTK Budapest and CSKA Sofia.

Celtic enjoyed further domestic success in the 1980s, and in their Centenary season of 1987–88 won a Scottish Premier Division and Scottish Cup double.

The club endured a slump in the early 1990s, culminating in the Bank of Scotland informing directors on 3 March 1994 that it was calling in the receivers as a result of the club exceeding a £5 million overdraft. However, expatriate businessman Fergus McCann wrested control of the club, and ousted the family dynasties which had controlled Celtic since its foundation. According to media reports, McCann took over the club minutes before it was to be declared bankrupt. McCann reconstituted the club business as a public limited company – Celtic PLC – and oversaw the redevelopment of Celtic Park into a 60,832 all-seater stadium. In 1998 Celtic won the title again under Dutchman Wim Jansen and prevented Rangers from beating their nine-in-a-row record.

Martin O'Neill took charge of the club in June 2000. Under his leadership, Celtic won three SPL championships out of five (losing the others by very small margins) and in his first season in charge the club also won the domestic treble, making O'Neill only the second Celtic manager to do so after Jock Stein. In 2003, around 80,000 Celtic fans travelled to watch the club compete in the UEFA Cup Final in Seville. Celtic lost 3–2 to Porto after extra time, despite two goals from Henrik Larsson during normal time. The conduct of the thousands of travelling Celtic supporters received widespread praise from the people of Seville and the fans were awarded Fair Play Awards from both FIFA and UEFA "for their extraordinarily loyal and sporting behaviour".

Gordon Strachan was announced as O'Neill's replacement in June 2005 and after winning the SPL title in his first year in charge, he became only the third Celtic manager to win three titles in a row. He also guided Celtic to their first UEFA Champions League knockout stage in 2006–07 and repeated the feat in 2007–08 before departing the club in May 2009, after failing to win the SPL title. Tony Mowbray took charge of the club in June 2009, and he was succeeded a year later by Neil Lennon. In November 2010, Celtic set an SPL record for the biggest win in SPL history, defeating Aberdeen 9–0 at Celtic Park.

Celtic celebrated their 125th anniversary in November 2012, the same week as a Champions League match against Barcelona. They won 2–1 on the night to complete a memorable week, and eventually qualified from the group stages for the round of 16. Celtic finished the season with the SPL and Scottish Cup double. The club clinched their third consecutive league title in March 2014, with goalkeeper Fraser Forster setting a new record during the campaign of 1,256 minutes without conceding a goal in a league match. At the end of the season, manager Neil Lennon announced his departure from the club after four years in the role.

Norwegian Ronny Deila was appointed manager of Celtic on 6 June 2014. He went on to lead the team to two consecutive league titles and a League Cup, but the team's performances in European competition were poor. After being eliminated from the Scottish Cup by Rangers in April 2016, Deila announced he would leave the club at the end of the season.

On 20 May 2016, Brendan Rodgers was announced as Deila's successor. His first season saw the team go on a long unbeaten run in domestic competitions, during which time the club won their 100th major trophy, defeating Aberdeen 3–0 in the League Cup Final in November 2016. Celtic also clinched their sixth successive league title in April 2017 with a record eight league games to spare, and eventually finished with a record 106 points, becoming the first Scottish side to complete a top-flight league season undefeated since Rangers in 1899. Celtic clinched their fourth treble by defeating Aberdeen 2–1 in the 2017 Scottish Cup Final, the result of which saw the club go through the entire domestic season unbeaten.

Celtic continued their unbeaten domestic run into the following season, eventually extending it to 69 games, surpassing their own 100-year-old British record of 62 games, before finally losing to Hearts in November 2017. Celtic retained the League Cup that same month by defeating Motherwell in the final, and went on to clinch their seventh consecutive league title in April 2018. They went on to defeat Motherwell again in the 2018 Scottish Cup Final to clinch a second consecutive domestic treble (the "double treble"), the first club in Scotland to do so. Rodgers left the club midway through following season to join Leicester City; Neil Lennon returned as caretaker manager for the rest of the season and helped Celtic secure an unprecedented third consecutive domestic treble (the "treble treble"), defeating Hearts 2–1 in the 2019 Scottish Cup Final. Later that month, he was confirmed as the club's new manager.

In December 2019, Lennon led Celtic to a 1–0 win over Rangers in the 2019 Scottish League Cup Final, the club's tenth consecutive domestic trophy. By March 2020, Celtic were 13 points ahead in the league when professional football in Scotland was suspended due to the COVID-19 pandemic in the United Kingdom. they were confirmed as champions in May 2020 following a SPFL board meeting where it was agreed that completing the full league campaign was infeasible. The completion of the 2019–20 Scottish Cup was delayed, with the semi-finals and final – between Celtic and Hearts as in the previous year – not taking place until late autumn/winter of 2020. Celtic won on penalty-kicks after the sides tied at 3–3 after extra time, clinching a fourth successive treble. However, Celtic struggled throughout the 2020–21 season with poor performances in Europe, knocked out of the League Cup by Ross County, and by February 2021 were trailing 18 points behind Rangers in the league – effectively ending their hopes of winning "ten in a row" league titles. Lennon resigned on 24 February 2021, with assistant manager John Kennedy taking interim charge of the team. In the closing weeks of the season, Celtic were knocked out of the Scottish Cup by Rangers which condemned them to their first trophy-less season since 2010, and finished the league campaign 25 points behind their Glasgow rivals.

Crest and colours

  

For most of Celtic's history their home strip has featured green and white horizontal hoops, but their original strip consisted of a white top with black shorts and black and green hooped socks. The top also featured the Marist Brothers' badge on the right hand side, consisting of a green Celtic cross inside a red circle. In 1889, the club changed to a green and white vertically striped top and for the next fourteen years this remained unchanged although the colour of the shorts alternated between white and black several times over this period. The top did not feature a crest.

In 1903, Celtic adopted their now famous green and white hooped tops. The new design was worn for the first time on 15 August 1903 in a match against Partick Thistle. Black socks continued to be worn until the early 1930s, at which point the team switched to green socks. Plain white socks came into use in the mid-1960s, and white has been the predominant colour worn since then.

The club began using a badge in the 1930s, featuring a four leaf clover logo surrounded by the club's formal title, "The Celtic Football and Athletic Coy. Ltd". However, it was not until 1977 that Celtic finally adopted the club crest on their shirts. The outer segment was reversed out, with white lettering on a green background on the team shirts.  The text around the clover logo on the shirts was also shortened from the official club crest to "The Celtic Football Club". For their centenary year in 1988, a commemorative crest was worn, featuring the Celtic cross that appeared on their first shirts. The 1977 version was reinstated for season 1989–90.

From 1945 onwards numbered shirts slowly came into use throughout Scotland, before becoming compulsory in 1960.  By this time Celtic were the last club in Britain to adopt the use of numbers on the team strip to identify players.  The traditionalist and idealistic Celtic chairman, Robert Kelly, baulked at the prospect of the famous green and white hoops being disfigured, and as such Celtic wore their numbers on the players' shorts. This unusual tradition survived until 1994, although numbered shirts were worn in European competition from 1975 onwards.  Celtic's tradition of wearing numbers on their shorts rather than on the back of their shirts was brought to an end when the Scottish Football League instructed Celtic to wear numbers on their shirts from the start of the 1994–95 season. Celtic responded by adding numbers to the top of their sleeves, however within a few weeks the football authorities ordered the club to attach them to the back of their shirts, where they appeared on a large white patch, breaking up the green and white hoops.

In 1984 Celtic took up shirt sponsorship for the first time, with Fife-based double glazing firm CR Smith having their logo emblazoned on the front of the team jersey.  In season 1991–92, Celtic switched to Glasgow-based car sales company Peoples as sponsors.  The club failed to secure a shirt sponsor for season 1992–93, and for the first time since the early 1980s Celtic took to the field in 'unblemished' hoops.  Despite the loss of marketing revenue, sales of the new unsponsored replica top increased dramatically.  Celtic regained shirt sponsorship for season 1993–94, with CR Smith returning as shirt sponsors in a four-year deal.

In 2005 the club severed their connection with Umbro, suppliers of their kits since the 1960s and entered into a contract with Nike.  To mark the 40th anniversary of their European Cup win, a special crest was introduced for the 2007–08 season. The star that represents this triumph was retained when the usual crest was reinstated the following season.  In 2012, a retro style kit was designed by Nike that included narrower hoops to mark the club's 125th anniversary.  A special crest was introduced with a Celtic knot design embroidered round the traditional badge. A third-choice strip based on the first strip from 1888 was also adopted for the season.

In March 2015, Celtic agreed a new kit deal worth £30 million with Boston-based sportswear manufacturer New Balance to replace Nike from the start of the 2015–16 season.

All of the kits for the 2017–18 season paid tribute to the Lisbon Lions, with the kits having a line on each side to represent the handles of the European Cup. The kits also included a commemorative crest, designed specifically for the season. The regular crest was reinstated the following season, although the away strip featured a Celtic cross once again in reference to the club's heritage.

In March 2020, Celtic announced a new five-year partnership with Adidas starting on 1 July 2020, in a deal believed to be the biggest kit sponsorship ever in Scottish sport.

Stadium

Celtic's stadium is Celtic Park, which is in the Parkhead area of Glasgow. It is commonly known as Parkhead or Paradise.

Celtic opened the original Celtic Park in the Parkhead area in 1888. The club moved to a different site in 1892, however, when the rental charge was greatly increased. The new site was developed into an oval shaped stadium, with vast terracing sections. The record attendance of 83,500 was set by an Old Firm derby on 1 January 1938. The terraces were covered and floodlights were installed between 1957 and 1971. The Taylor Report mandated that all major clubs should have an all-seated stadium by August 1994. Celtic was in a bad financial position in the early 1990s and no major work was carried out until Fergus McCann took control of the club in March 1994. He carried out a plan to demolish the old terraces and develop a new stadium in a phased rebuild, which was completed in August 1998. During this development, Celtic spent the 1994–95 season playing at the national stadium Hampden Park, costing the club £500,000 in rent. The total cost of the new stadium on its completion was £40 million.

Celtic Park has been used as a venue for Scotland internationals and Cup Finals, particularly when Hampden Park has been unavailable. Before the First World War, Celtic Park hosted various other sporting events, including composite rules shinty-hurling, track and field and the 1897 Track Cycling World Championships. Open-air masses, and First World War recruitment drives have also been held there. In more recent years, Celtic Park has hosted the Opening Ceremonies of the 2014 Commonwealth Games, the 2005 Special Olympics National Games and the 1990 Special Olympics European Games. Celtic Park has occasionally been used for concerts, including performances by The Who and U2.

In July 2016, Celtic Park became the first British football stadium to have a "rail seating" (safe standing) area in the ground. Rail seating is particularly common in Germany's Bundesliga, most notably at Borussia Dortmund's Westfalenstadion, a ground with a reputation on par with Celtic Park for its intensity and atmosphere.

In June 2018, Celtic announced a series of stadium improvements that would be implemented before the 2018–19 season. These include the installation of new LED floodlights and a new entertainment system, a stadium-wide PA system and a new hybrid playing surface.

Supporters

In 2003 Celtic were estimated to have a fan base of nine million people, including one million in the US and Canada. There are over 160 Celtic Supporters Clubs in over 20 countries around the world.

An estimated 80,000 Celtic supporters, many without match tickets, travelled to Seville in Spain for the UEFA Cup Final in May 2003. The club's fans subsequently received awards from UEFA and FIFA for their behaviour at the match.

Celtic has the highest average home attendance of any Scottish club. They also had the 12th highest average league attendance out of all the football clubs in Europe in 2011. A study of stadium attendance figures from 2013 to 2018 by the CIES Football Observatory ranked Celtic at 16th in the world during that period, and their proportion of the distribution of spectators in Scotland at 36.5%, the highest of any club in the leagues examined.

In October 2013, French football magazine  published a list of whom they considered the 'best' football supporters in the world. Celtic fans were placed third, the only club in Britain on the list, with the magazine highlighting their rendition of You'll Never Walk Alone before the start of European ties at Celtic Park.

On 23 October 2017, Celtic fans were awarded with the FIFA Fan Award for their tifo commemorating the 50th anniversary of the club's European cup win. The award "celebrates the best fan moment of November 2016 to August 2017".

Sectarianism

Celtic's traditional rivals are Rangers; collectively, the two clubs are known as the Old Firm and seen by some as the world's biggest football derby. The two have dominated Scottish football's history; between them, they have won the Scottish league championship 107 times (as of May 2022) since its inception in 1890 – all other clubs combined have won 19 championships. The two clubs are also by far the most supported in Scotland, with Celtic having the sixth highest home attendance in the UK during season 2014–15. Celtic have a historic association with the people of Ireland and Scots of Irish descent, both of whom are mainly Roman Catholic. Traditionally fans of rivals Rangers came from Scottish or Northern Irish Protestant backgrounds and support Unionism in Ireland.

The clubs have attracted the support of opposing factions in the Troubles in Northern Ireland. Some supporters use songs, chants and banners at matches to abuse or show support for the Protestant or Catholic religions and proclaim support for Northern Irish paramilitary groups such as the IRA and UVF.

There have been over 400 Old Firm matches played. The games have been described as having an "atmosphere of hatred, religious tension and intimidation which continues to lead to violence in communities across Scotland." The rivalry has fuelled many assaults and even deaths on Old Firm Derby days. Admissions to hospital emergency rooms have been reported to increase ninefold over normal levels and in the period from 1996 to 2003, eight deaths in Glasgow were directly linked to Old Firm matches, and hundreds of assaults.

Both sets of fans fought on the pitch after Celtic's victory in the 1980 Scottish Cup Final at Hampden Park. There was serious fan disorder during an Old Firm match played in May 1999 at Celtic Park; missiles were thrown by Celtic fans, including one which struck referee Hugh Dallas, who needed medical treatment and a small number of fans invaded the pitch.

Celtic have taken measures to reduce sectarianism. In 1996, the club launched its Bhoys Against Bigotry campaign, later followed by Youth Against Bigotry to "educate the young on having ... respect for all aspects of the community – all races, all colours, all creeds".

Irish republicanism
Some groups of Celtic fans have expressed their support for Irish republicanism and the Irish Republican Army by singing or chanting about them at matches.

In 2008 and 2010, there were protests by groups of fans over the team wearing the poppy for Remembrance Day, as the symbol is opposed by Irish Republicans owing to its association with the British military. Celtic expressed disapproval of these protests, saying they were damaging to the image of the club and its fans, and pledged to ban those involved. In 2011, UEFA and the Scottish Premier League investigated the club over pro-IRA chants by fans at different games. UEFA fined Celtic £12,700, while the SPL took no action, as the club had taken all reasonable action to prevent the chants.

Celtic media

In 1965, Celtic began publishing its own newspaper, The Celtic View, now the oldest club magazine in football. It was the brainchild of future chairman Jack McGinn, who at the time was working in the circulation department of Beaverbrook Newspapers. McGinn himself edited the paper for the first few years, with circulation initially reaching around 26,000 copies. By 2020, it was a 72-page glossy magazine with over 6,000 weekly readers, and the top selling club magazine in the United Kingdom. In the spring of 2020, the magazine saw a temporary cease of production due to the outbreak of the COVID-19 pandemic in the UK. However, in August 2021, Celtic announced the restart of the production activities for the magazine, which was turned into a 100-page, quarterly publication.

From 2002, Celtic's Internet TV channel Channel67 (previously known as Celtic Replay) broadcast Celtic's own content worldwide and offered live match coverage to subscribers outside the UK. It also provided three online channels. In 2004, Celtic launched their own digital TV channel called Celtic TV, which was available in the UK through Setanta Sports on satellite and cable platforms. Due to the collapse of Setanta in the UK in June 2009, Celtic TV stopped broadcasting, although the club hoped to find a new broadcast partner. In 2011, Celtic TV was relaunched as an online service and replaced Channel 67.

Influence on other clubs
Due to Celtic's large following, several clubs have decided to emulate or have been inspired by Celtic. As the club has a large following, especially in Northern Ireland, several clubs have been founded there by local Celtic fans. The most notable and successful was Belfast Celtic, formed in 1891 simply as Celtic. Upon incorporation as a limited company in 1901, however, the club adopted the name "Belfast Celtic", the title "Celtic Football Club Ltd" already being registered by the Glasgow club. Their home from the same year was Celtic Park on Donegall Road in west Belfast, known to the fans as Paradise. It was one of the most successful teams in Ireland until it withdrew from the Irish League in 1949. Donegal Celtic, currently playing in the NIFL Premier Intermediate League, was established in 1970, with the Celtic part being taken on due to the massive local following for Scotland's Celtic and formerly Belfast Celtic. They are nicknamed The Wee Hoops and play at Donegal Celtic Park on Suffolk Road in Belfast.
A club by the name of Lurgan Celtic was originally formed in 1903, with the obvious slant of aiming towards the Roman Catholic community of the town, adopting the name and colours of the Glaswegian Celtic. The County Armagh club currently plays in the NIFL Championship. In the Republic of Ireland, both Tuam Celtic A.F.C. and Castlebar Celtic F.C. play at grounds called Celtic Park.

Throughout Scotland and England, other clubs have been named after and adopted Celtic's kit. These include the now defunct Scottish club Blantyre Celtic F.C.; Irish club Listowel Celtic F.C.; and English lower-league clubs Cleator Moor Celtic F.C., which was founded in 1908–09 by Irish immigrants employed in the local iron ore mines, Celtic Nation F.C. (now defunct) and West Allotment Celtic F.C.
Somerset club Yeovil Town F.C., who traditionally wore an all-green shirt, modified their uniform to emulate Celtic's, inspired by the Scottish club's 2003 UEFA Cup run.

Outside the British Isles, South African club Bloemfontein Celtic F.C., one of the most popular club in the country with a large fan base in the Free State, is also named after Celtic F.C. Founded in 1969 as Mangaung United, in 1984, the then owner Molemela took over the club and changed the name to Bloemfontein Celtic. Based in Bloemfontein, they play in the Premier Soccer League. In the United States of America, Hurricanes F.C. of Houston, Texas rebranded as Celtic FC America in 2019 and play in the Texas Premier Soccer League.

Celtic and charity
Celtic was initially founded to raise money for the poor in the East End of Glasgow and the club still retain strong charitable traditions today. In 1995 the Celtic Charity Fund was formed with the aim of "revitalising Celtic's charitable traditions" and by September 2013 had raised over £5 million.  The Charity Fund has since then merged with the Celtic Foundation, forming the Celtic FC Foundation, and continues to raise money for local, national and international causes.

On 9 August 2011 Celtic held a testimonial match in honour of former player John Kennedy. Due to the humanitarian crisis in East Africa, the entire proceeds were donated to Oxfam. An estimated £300,000 was raised.

Celtic hold an annual charity fashion show at Celtic Park. In 2011 the main beneficiaries were Breast Cancer Care Scotland.

Yorkhill Hospital is another charity with whom Celtic are affiliated and in December 2011 the club donated £3000 to it. Chief Executive Peter Lawwell said that; "Celtic has always been much more than a football club and it is important that, at all times we play an important role in the wider community. The club is delighted to have enjoyed such a long and positive connection with Yorkhill Hospital."

Ownership and finances

Private company
Celtic were formed in 1887, and in 1897 the club became a Private Limited Company with a nominal share capital of 5000 shares at £1 each. The following year a further share issue of 5000 £1 shares was created to raise more capital. The largest number of shares held were by businessmen from the East End of Glasgow, notably James Grant, an Irish publican and engineer, James Kelly, one of the club's original players turned publican, and John Glass, a builder and driving force in the early years of the club. His shares, upon his death in 1906, passed on to Thomas White. The Grant, Kelly and White families' shareholdings dominated ownership of the club throughout the 20th century.

The late 1940s saw Robert Kelly, son of James Kelly, become chairman of the club after having been a director since 1931. Desmond White also joined the board around this time, upon the death of his father Thomas White. By the 1950s, a significant number of shares in the club had passed to Neil and Felicia Grant, who lived in Toomebridge, County Antrim. These shares accounted for more than a sixth of the club's total issue. Club chairman Robert Kelly's own family share-holding was of a similar size, and he used his close relationship with the Toomebridge Grants to ensure his power base at Celtic was unchallengeable. When Neil Grant died in the early 1960s, his shareholding passed to his sister Felicia, leaving her as the largest share-holder in Celtic. This gave rise to the myth among Celtic supporters of the "old lady in Ireland" who supposedly had the ultimate say in the running of the club.

Celtic's board of directors had a reputation of being miserly and authoritarian. In particular they were known for frequently selling their top players and not paying their staff enough; they were also seen as lacking ambition, which caused friction with several managers. Jimmy McGrory's tenure as manager is generally considered a period of underachievement, but with Chairman Robert Kelly's domineering influence. many have questioned how much authority McGrory ever had in team selection. Even Jock Stein's time as manager ended on a sour note when he was offered a place on the Celtic board, but in a role involving ticket sales. Stein felt that this was demeaning, stating he was "a football man, not a ticket salesman". He declined this offer and decided to stay in football management, joining Leeds United instead. Billy McNeill won a trophy in each of his five seasons as manager, but was still paid less than the managers of Rangers, Aberdeen and Dundee United. He left the club in June 1983 after his request for a contract and pay rise was publicly rebuffed by the board. McNeill moved on to manage Manchester City, stating that to remain at Celtic would have been humiliating. McNeill's successor, Davie Hay, also had his difficulties with the Celtic board. When trying to sign players in 1987 to strengthen his squad to compete with high-spending Rangers, the board refused to pay for them; chairman Jack McGinn was quoted as saying that if Hay wanted these players, "he will have to pay for them himself".

By the end of the 1980s the Celtic board consisted of chairman McGinn and directors Kevin Kelly, Chris White, Tom Grant and Jimmy Farrell. Neither McGinn nor Farrell were members of the traditional family dynasties at Celtic. Farrell was a partner in the Shaughnessy law firm that had long-standing connections with Celtic, and was invited to become a director in 1964. McGinn had set up The Celtic View in the 1960s and later became the club's commercial manager. He was given a seat on the board and became chairman in 1986. In May 1990 the former Lord Provost of Glasgow, Michael Kelly, and property developer Brian Dempsey were invited to join the Celtic board. Dempsey did not last long however, as a dispute about a proposed relocation to Robroyston resulted in him being voted off the board five months later.

McCann takeover and transition to plc
Throughout the 1960s and 70s Celtic had been one of the strongest clubs in Europe. However, the directors failed to accompany the wave of economic development facing football in the 1980s, although the club continued to remain successful on the field, albeit limited to the domestic scene in Scotland. In 1989, the club's annual budget was £6.4 million, about a third as much as Barcelona, with a debt of around 40% and on-field success deteriorating. In the early 1990s the situation began to worsen as playing success declined dramatically and the club slipped further into debt.

In 1993 fans began organising pressure groups to protest against the board, one of the most prominent being "Celts for Change". They supported a takeover bid led by Canadian-based businessman Fergus McCann and former director Brian Dempsey. Football writer Jim Traynor described McCann's attempt to buy the club as "good against evil". Despite declining attendances and increasing unrest amongst supporters, the Kelly, White and Grant family groupings continued to guard their control of Celtic.

On 4 March 1994, McCann bought Celtic for £9 million, finally wresting control from the family dynasties that had run the club for almost 100 years. When he bought the club it was reported to be within 24 hours of entering receivership due to exceeding a £5 million overdraft with the Bank of Scotland. He turned Celtic into a public limited company through a share issue which raised over £14 million, the most successful share issue in British football history. He also oversaw the building of a new stadium, the 60,000 seater Celtic Park, which cost £40 million and at the time was Britain's largest club stadium. This allowed Celtic to progress as a club because over £20 million was being raised each year from season ticket sales.

McCann had maintained that he would only be at Celtic for five years and in September 1999 he announced that his 50.3% stake in Celtic was for sale. McCann had wanted the ownership of Celtic to be spread as widely as possible and gave first preference to existing shareholders and season-ticket holders, to prevent a new consortium taking over the club. 14.4 million shares were sold by McCann at a value of 280 pence each. McCann made £40 million out of this, meaning he left Celtic with a £31 million profit. During his tenure, turnover at Celtic rose by 385% to £33.8m and operating profits rose from £282,000 to £6.7m. McCann was often criticised during his time at Celtic and many people disagreed with him over building a stadium which they thought Celtic could not fill, not investing enough in the squad and being overly focused on finance. However, McCann was responsible for the financial recovery of the club and for providing a very good platform for it to build on. After he left Celtic, the club were able to invest in players and achieved much success such as winning the treble in 2000–01 and reaching the 2003 UEFA Cup Final.

After McCann's exit, Irish billionaire Dermot Desmond was left as the majority shareholder. He purchased 2.8 million of McCann's shares to increase his stake in the club from 13% to 20%.

In 2005, Celtic issued a share offer designed to raise £15 million for the club; 50 million new shares were made available priced at 30p each. It was also revealed that majority shareholder Desmond would buy around £10 million worth of the shares. £10 million of the money raised was for building a new training centre and youth academy, expanding the club's global scouting network and investing in coaching and player development programmes. The rest of the money was to be used to reduce debt. Building a youth academy was important for Celtic to surpass both Hearts and Rangers who had superior youth facilities at the time. The share issue was a success and Celtic had more applicants than shares available, The new Lennoxtown training centre was opened in October 2007.

Celtic have been ranked in the Deloitte Football Money League six times. This lists the top 20 football clubs in the world according to revenue. They were ranked between 2002 (2000–01 season), 2006 (2004–05 season) and 2008 (2006–07 season).

Celtic's financial results for 2011 showed that the club's debt had been reduced from £5.5 million to £500,000 and that a pre-tax profit of £100,000 had been achieved, compared with a loss of over £2 million the previous year. Turnover also decreased by 15% from £63 million to £52 million.

In May 2012, Celtic were rated 37th in Brand Finance's annual valuation of the world's biggest football clubs. Celtic's brand was valued at $64 million (£40.7 million), $15 million more than the previous year. It was the first time a Scottish club had been ranked in the top 50. Matt Hannagan, Sports Brand Valuation Analyst at Brand Finance, said that Celtic were constrained by the amount of money they got from the SPL and that if they were in the Premiership then, due to their large fan base, they could be in the top 10 clubs in the world. Later that month David Low, the financial consultant who advised Fergus McCann on his takeover of Celtic in 1994, said that Celtic's 'enterprise value' (how much it would cost to buy the club) was £52 million.

Players

First-team squad

Out on loan

Academy squads
For more details on the academy squads, see Celtic F.C. B Team and Academy.

Women's team

Celtic have a pathway for female players, from eleven years old upwards. In 2007 the club launched their women's first team, sometimes known as Celtic Women. The women's team reached the Scottish Women's Cup Final in their first season, and won their first trophy in 2010, the Scottish Women's Premier League Cup. In December 2018 they announced a move to full-time training, becoming the first professional women's football team in Scotland.

Former players
For further information, see List of Celtic F.C. players for players with over 100 appearances or other stated notability, List of Celtic F.C. international footballers and Category:Celtic FC players for a general list of ex-players.

Club captains
For further information, see Celtic club captains

Greatest ever team

In 2002 the greatest ever Celtic team was voted by supporters:
  Ronnie Simpson
  Danny McGrain
  Tommy Gemmell
  Bobby Murdoch
  Paul McStay 
  Billy McNeill – Voted Celtic's greatest ever captain
  Bertie Auld
  Jimmy Johnstone – Voted Celtic's greatest ever player
  Bobby Lennox 
  Kenny Dalglish
  Henrik Larsson – Voted Celtic's greatest ever foreign player

Club officials

Board of directors

Management

For Celtic's B Team and youth management, see Celtic F.C. Under-20s and Academy.

Managerial history

Halls of Fame

Scotland Football Hall of Fame
As of 1 June 2020, 27 Celtic players and managers have entered the Scottish Football Hall of Fame:

 Roy Aitken
 Bertie Auld
 Stevie Chalmers
 John Clark
 Jim Craig
 Paddy Crerand
 Sir Kenny Dalglish MBE
 Jimmy Delaney
 Bobby Evans
 Tommy Gemmell
 Mo Johnston
 Jimmy Johnstone
 Paul Lambert
 Henrik Larsson
 Bobby Lennox
 Willie Maley
 Danny McGrain
 Jimmy McGrory
 Billy McNeill
 Paul McStay
 Bobby Murdoch
 Charlie Nicholas
 Ronnie Simpson
 Jock Stein CBE
 Gordon Strachan
 John Thomson
 Willie Wallace

Scotland Roll of Honour
The Scotland national football team roll of honour recognises players who have gained 50 or more international caps for Scotland. Inductees to have played for Celtic are:

 Roy Aitken (50)
 Tom Boyd (66)
 Scott Brown (52)
 Gary Caldwell (17)
 John Collins (32)
 Kenny Dalglish MBE (47)
 Craig Gordon (14)
 Danny McGrain MBE (62)
 Paul McStay (76)
 Kenny Miller (7)

Numbers in brackets indicate the number of caps the above players won whilst at Celtic.

Scottish Sports Hall of Fame
In the Scottish Sports Hall of Fame, five Celtic players have been selected, they are:

 Sir Kenny Dalglish MBE
 Jimmy Johnstone
 Jimmy McGrory
 Billy McNeill MBE
 Jock Stein CBE

Honours

Domestic honours

 Scottish League Championship: 52
 1892–93, 1893–94, 1895–96, 1897–98, 1904–05, 1905–06, 1906–07, 1907–08, 1908–09, 1909–10, 1913–14, 1914–15, 1915–16, 1916–17, 1918–19, 1921–22, 1925–26, 1935–36, 1937–38, 1953–54, 1965–66, 1966–67, 1967–68, 1968–69, 1969–70, 1970–71, 1971–72, 1972–73, 1973–74, 1976–77, 1978–79, 1980–81, 1981–82, 1985–86, 1987–88, 1997–98, 2000–01, 2001–02, 2003–04, 2005–06, 2006–07, 2007–08, 2011–12, 2012–13, 2013–14, 2014–15, 2015–16, 2016–17, 2017–18, 2018–19, 2019–20, 2021–22

 Scottish Cup: 40
 1891–92, 1898–99, 1899–1900, 1903–04, 1906–07, 1907–08, 1910–11, 1911–12, 1913–14, 1922–23, 1924–25, 1926–27, 1930–31, 1932–33, 1936–37, 1950–51, 1953–54, 1964–65, 1966–67, 1968–69, 1970–71, 1971–72, 1973–74, 1974–75, 1976–77, 1979–80, 1984–85, 1987–88, 1988–89, 1994–95, 2000–01, 2003–04, 2004–05, 2006–07, 2010–11, 2012–13, 2016–17, 2017–18, 2018–19, 2019–20

 Scottish League Cup: 21
 1956–57, 1957–58, 1965–66, 1966–67, 1967–68, 1968–69, 1969–70, 1974–75, 1982–83, 1997–98, 1999–2000, 2000–01, 2005–06, 2008–09, 2014–15, 2016–17, 2017–18, 2018–19, 2019–20, 2021–22,  2022–23

Continental honours
 European Cup
 Winners: 1966–67
 Runners-up: 1969–70
 UEFA Cup
 Runners-up: 2002–03
 Intercontinental Cup
 Runners-up: 1967

Other awards
 BBC Sports Personality of the Year Team Award: 1
 1967
 France Football European Team of the Year: 1
 1970
 FIFA Fair Play Award: 1
 20031
 UEFA Fair Play Award: 1
 20031
 FIFA Fan Award: 1
 20171

1 Awarded to the fans of Celtic.

Trebles
League Title, Scottish Cup, League Cup: 7
1966–67, 1968–69, 2000–01, 2016–17, 2017–18, 2018–19, 2019–20

Doubles
League Title and Scottish Cup: 12
1906–07, 1907–08, 1913–14, 1953–54, 1970–71, 1971–72, 1973–74, 1976–77, 1987–88, 2003–04, 2006–07, 2012–13
League Title and League Cup: 7
1965–66, 1967–68, 1969–70, 1997–98, 2005–06, 2014–15, 2021–22
Scottish Cup and Scottish League Cup: 1
1974–75

Records

Club records

 The Scottish Cup final win against Aberdeen in 1937 was attended by a crowd of 147,365 at Hampden Park in Glasgow, which remains a world record gate for a national cup final, and also the highest attendance for a club football match in Europe.
 Highest attendance for a European club competition match: 136,505 against Leeds United in the European Cup semi-final at Hampden Park (15 April 1970).
 Record home attendance: 83,500 against Rangers on 1 January 1938. A 3–0 victory for Celtic.
 UK record for an unbeaten run in domestic professional football: 69 games (60 won, 9 drawn), from 15 May 2016 until 17 December 2017  – a total of 582 days in all.
 SPL record for an unbeaten run of home matches: 77 games, from 2001 to 2004.
 14 consecutive League Cup final appearances, from season 1964–65 to 1977–78 inclusive, a world record for successive appearances in the final of a major football competition.
 World record for total number of goals scored in a season (competitive games only): 196 (season 1966–67).
 Most goals scored in one Scottish top-flight league match by one player: eight goals by Jimmy McGrory against Dunfermline in 9–0 win on 14 January 1928.
 Highest score in a domestic British cup final: Celtic 7–1 Rangers (1957 Scottish League Cup Final).
 Fastest hat-trick in European Club Football: Mark Burchill against Jeunesse Esch in 2000; 3 minutes (between twelfth minute and fifteenth minute), a record at the time.
 Earliest Scottish Premiership title won: Won with eight games remaining in 2017, against Heart of Midlothian on 2 April 2017.
 Biggest margin of victory in the SPL: 9–0 against Aberdeen, 6 November 2010. 
 Biggest margin of victory in the Scottish Premiership: 9–0 against Dundee United, 28 August 2022.
 Celtic and Hibernian hold the record for the largest transfer fee between two Scottish clubs (Scott Brown in May 2007).
 Most expensive export from Scottish football: Kieran Tierney to Arsenal (August 2019).
 First weekly football club publication in the UK: The Celtic View.
 First European club to field a player from the Indian sub-continent: Mohammed Salim.
 Gil Heron, who signed for Celtic in 1951, was the first black person to play professionally in Scotland; his son Gil Scott-Heron rose to prominence in the 1970s as a hugely influential jazz and soul musician.

Individual records
 Record appearances (all competitions): Billy McNeill, 822 from 1957 to 1975
 Record appearances (League): Alec McNair, 583 from 1904 to 1925
 Most capped player for Scotland: 102 (47 whilst at Celtic), Kenny Dalglish
 Most international caps for Scotland while a Celtic player: 76, Paul McStay
 Most caps won whilst at Celtic: 80, Pat Bonner
 Record scorer: Jimmy McGrory, 522 (1922/23 – 1937/38)
 Record scorer in league: Jimmy McGrory, 396
 Most goals in a season (all competitions): Jimmy McGrory, 62 (1927/28) (47 in League, 15 in Cup competitions)
 Most goals in a season (league only): Jimmy McGrory, 50 (1935/36)

Club partners
As of 12 June 2022, Celtic has partnerships with:

 Adidas
 Dafabet
 Magners
 Intelligent Car Leasing
 JD Sports
 Coca-Cola
 Powerade
 Sky Sports
 BT Sport
 Eden Mill
 Konami

 Eleven Sports Media
 Forbes on the Square
 Celtic Compare
 Cadbury
 Clyde 1
 Go Radio
 Nirvana Europe
 Primal Strength
 Homeheat
 Utilita Energy
 Be Cordial Hotels

 University of the West of Scotland
 Catapult Sports
 My Personal English Coach
 Vitality
 Soccer Supplement
 Squalk
 The Turmeric Co.
 UFL
 Indigo Unified Communications
 Sorare

Footnotes

References

 Sources

External links

 
 Club information at fitbastats.com

 
1888 establishments in Scotland
Celtic
Companies based in Glasgow
Culture in Glasgow
Football clubs in Scotland
Publicly traded sports companies
Irish diaspora sports clubs in Scotland
Scottish Cup winners
Scottish League Cup winners
UEFA Champions League winning clubs
Scottish Football League founder members
Scottish Football League teams
Scottish Premier League teams
Scottish Professional Football League teams
Football clubs in Glasgow
Unrelegated association football clubs